The 2017–18 UEFA Women's Champions League was the 17th season of the European women's club football championship organised by UEFA, and the ninth since being rebranded as the UEFA Women's Champions League.

The final was held at the Valeriy Lobanovskyi Dynamo Stadium in Kyiv, Ukraine on 24 May 2018, two days before the final of the men's tournament played at the NSC Olimpiyskiy Stadium in the same city.

In the final, Lyon defeated Wolfsburg to win a record fifth title, and also became the first team to win three titles in a row.

Association team allocation
A maximum of 68 teams from 55 UEFA member associations were eligible to participate in the 2017–18 UEFA Women's Champions League. The association ranking based on the UEFA league coefficient for women is used to determine the number of participating teams for each association:
Associations 1–12 each have two teams qualify.
All other associations, should they enter, each have one team qualify.
The winners of the 2016–17 UEFA Women's Champions League are given an additional entry if they do not qualify for the 2017–18 UEFA Women's Champions League through their domestic league. Since the title holders Lyon qualified through their domestic league, the additional entry for the Champions League title holders was not necessary for this season.

Association ranking
For the 2017–18 UEFA Women's Champions League, the associations are allocated places according to their 2016 UEFA league coefficients for women, which takes into account their performance in European competitions from 2011–12 to 2015–16.

Notes
 – Additional berth for title holders
 – Did not enter
 – No rank (association did not enter in the five seasons used for computing coefficients)

Distribution
The format of the competition remained unchanged from previous years, starting from the qualifying round (played as mini-tournaments with four teams in each group), followed by the knockout phase starting from the round of 32 (played as home-and-away two-legged ties except for the one-match final).

Unlike the men's Champions League, not every association enters a team, and so the exact number of teams entering in each round (qualifying round and round of 32) can not be determined until the full entry list is known. In general, the title holders, the champions of the top 12 associations, plus the runners-up of highest-ranked associations (exact number depending on the number of entries) receive a bye to the round of 32. All other teams (runners-up of lowest-ranked associations plus champions of associations starting from 13th) enter the qualifying round, with the group winners plus a maximum of two best runners-up advancing to the round of 32.

Teams
A record total of 61 teams from 49 associations entered this season's competition. Two associations had no league as of 2016–17 (Liechtenstein, San Marino). Andorra's league was not played eleven-a-side. The champions of Armenia (Yerevan LH), Azerbaijan (Gabala) and Gibraltar (Lincoln Red Imps) did not enter. Georgia entered a team for the first time since 2010–11, while Luxembourg returned after a one-year absence.

Among the entrants, 21 teams entered the round of 32: the champions and runners-up from associations 1–9 (including title holders Lyon) and the champions from associations 10–12. The remaining 40 teams entered the qualifying round: the runners-up from associations 10–12 and the champions from the 37 associations ranked 13 or lower.

Legend
TH: Women's Champions League title holders
CH: Domestic league champions
RU: Domestic league runners-up

Notes

Round and draw dates
UEFA has scheduled the competition as follows (all draws are held at the UEFA headquarters in Nyon, Switzerland).

Qualifying round

Group 1

Group 2

Group 3

Group 4

Group 5

Group 6

Group 7

Group 8

Group 9

Group 10

Ranking of second-placed teams
To determine the best second-placed team from the qualifying round which advanced to the knockout phase, only the results of the second-placed teams against the first and third-placed teams in their group were taken into account, while results against the fourth-placed team were not included. As a result, two matches played by each second-placed team counted for the purposes of determining the ranking.

Knockout phase

Bracket

Round of 32

Round of 16

Quarter-finals

Semi-finals

Final

Statistics
Notes

Top goalscorers
Qualifying goals count towards the topscorer award. The 15 goals scored by Ada Hegerberg was a new competition record.

Top assists

Squad of the season
The UEFA technical study group selected the following 18 players as the squad of the tournament:

See also
2017–18 UEFA Champions League

References

External links
Official website
UEFA Women's Champions League history: 2017/18
European league standings

 
2017-18
Women's Champions League
2017 in women's association football
2018 in women's association football